Lohman's Landing Building, also known as Jefferson Landing Building, is a historic commercial building located in Jefferson Landing State Historic Site at Jefferson City, Cole County, Missouri. It was built about 1834, and is a -story, rectangular limestone building.  It measures 71 feet, 6 inches, long and 50 feet deep.

It was listed on the National Register of Historic Places in 1969.  It is located in the Missouri State Capitol Historic District.

References

External links

Individually listed contributing properties to historic districts on the National Register in Missouri
Commercial buildings on the National Register of Historic Places in Missouri
Commercial buildings completed in 1834
Buildings and structures in Jefferson City, Missouri
National Register of Historic Places in Cole County, Missouri